Omar Jasim (born on September 23, 1990) is a Bahraini swimmer. He competed at the 2008 Summer Olympics.

His personal best for 50 m freestyle is 30.63 seconds (at 2008 Olympics).

References

External links
Bahrain team swimmers claim six more GCC medals

Living people
Bahraini male swimmers
Olympic swimmers of Bahrain
Swimmers at the 2008 Summer Olympics
1990 births